Women's Cot is a Nigerian film that was directed by Dickson Iroegbu in 2005. It was produced by Great Future Productions.

Plot

A woman whose husband has died and has become a widow. As a result of this challenge, members of the family treat her badly, so she decided to be at the widow's cot as result of threats from family relatives. In Nigeria, cultural practice dictates that a man's family can collect all of the deceased property when he dies, leaving his widow destitute. The widows in this film form a powerful group to prevent this practice, but they however become corrupt. The movie is about women's rights, murder and marriage.

Cast
 Bukky Ajayi 
 Rita Edochie
 Chidi Ihesie 
 Bimbo Manuel 
 Onyeka Onwenu 
 Zack Orji 
 Joke Silva

References

Nigerian drama films
2005 films